Ladislav Štaidl (10 March 1945 in Stříbrná Skalice – 31 January 2021 in Prague) was a Czech musician, guitarist, pianist, conductor, bandleader, composer, lyricist, music arranger, singer, and businessman. His older, prematurely deceased brother Jiří Štaidl was also a musician and lyricist.

On 28 October 2015, President Miloš Zeman awarded him the Medal of Merit.

On 31 January 2021, he succumbed to complications associated with COVID-19 at the General University Hospital in Prague during the COVID-19 pandemic in the Czech Republic.

References

External links
 
 

1945 births
2021 deaths
Czech musicians
Deaths from the COVID-19 pandemic in the Czech Republic
Czech songwriters
People from Prague-East District